Man Mohan Adhikari (Magi) ( 9 June 1920 – 26 April 1999) was the 31st Prime Minister of Nepal from 1994 to 1995, representing the Communist Party of Nepal (Unified Marxist-Leninist). He is the first communist Prime Minister in Nepal and one of the first communist politician in the world to be democratically elected as a head of government.

Family and early life
Born in Lazimpat, Kathmandu, Nepal, he spent his childhood in Biratnagar. His family was a landowner Brahmin family of Eastern Nepal. He was sent to Varanasi to study in 1938. While studying for his B.Sc. in 1942, Adhikari took part in Quit India movement and he was arrested by the British colonial authorities and jailed along with other politicians.

Life
During his stay in India, Adhikari became involved in the communist movement, joining the Communist Party of India. He returned to Biratnagar and worked in chemical industry where, in March 1947, he took part in the Biratnagar jute mill strike and was arrested and taken to Kathmandu via land route along with Girija Prasad Koirala and Bishweshwar Prasad Koirala.

He took part in the founding of the Communist Party of Nepal in 1949. In 1957/58 Man Mohan Adhikari participated in the first time ever democratically held Parliamentary Elections in Nepal only halfheartedly, since he was keen on broadening his organization, while he had already become a key figure of the Communist Movement in the country. In 1959, the then elected government, led by Prime Minister B.P. Koirala was sacked and the elected Parliament was dissolved by King Mahendra Bir Bikram Shah Deva citing several reasons. Man Mohan, who was then in his home town Biratnagar, Morang was arrested and lodged in a jail by the Koshi Zonal Commissioner Damodar Shumshere JB Rana. While he was in custody, the then democratically elected leader of Dharan Municipality Yagya Prasad Acharya, Secretary of then Nepal Communist Party Sunsari District Committee was entrusted by Man Mohan Adhikari to negotiate with the government authority for the release of communist leaders and cadres from the detention in Sunsari and Morang districts. Acharya had several rounds of parleys with communist leaders Mohan Adhikari, Shailendra Kumar Upadhyaya, Radha Prasad Ghimire and others inside the jail and Zonal Commissioner Rana and Chief Administrator of Morang District Jeevan Lal Satyal. Adhikari, was a democratic persona, so he was of the opinion that all leaders and cadres who were democratically elected in public positions such as municipal councils, should continue their jobs for maintaining continued contacts with their constituencies, instead of playing an opposition role and going to jail. This policy of Man Mohan was a key move for the re-invigoration and expansion of the communist party in Eastern Nepal.

As per the instruction of leader Adhikari, a public statement pledging support to the Constructive Leadership of the King was issued and several leaders of the then Nepal Communist Party under custody in Sunsari and Morang districts were freed. After release from the jail Shailendra Kumar Upadhyaya and Radha Parsad Ghimire (who was released after few months), Shailendra was given an audience by the King in Kathmandu, and entrusted an assignment to galvanize support for the political action taken by the King recently, who later was made the Assistant Home Affairs Minister of the country by King Mahendra.
 
During the Bangladesh Liberation War, Adhikari asserted that the war was an Indian aggression against Pakistan.

In November 1994, elections were held following a dissolution of parliament. Despite Congress securing a higher popular vote than the UML, the latter secured 88 seats to the former's 83. Neither party was successful in forming a coalition to hold a majority of the 205 seats. After failed coalition negotiations, however, Adhikari became Prime Minister of a minority government, acquiring the support of the National Democratic Party and the Sadbhavana Party.

In June 1995, the National Democratic Party and the Sadbhavana Party (who helped the UML form a minority government in November 1994) supported the Nepali Congress's call for a vote of no-confidence in Adhikari's government in a special session of the House of Representatives. Adhikari attempted to dissolve parliament and call elections in an attempt to replicate the circumstances under which he assumed office in 1994. But a Supreme Court challenge led by Congress saw this move deemed unconstitutional and the parliament was restored. The vote of no-confidence proceeded successfully. Elections in 1995 saw Adhikari's government voted out of office.

Adhikari was one of the few democratically elected communist party members in the world to serve as head of the government.

Health and death

Adhikari suffered from asthma for four decades and went to China for four years to seek treatment after contracting tuberculosis.

On 19 April 1999, he suffered a heart attack during an election rally in the village of Gothatar and fell into a coma. He was declared brain dead on 22 April with no hope of recovery. He died four days later. He was survived by his wife and two children.

References

External links

 Manmohan Adhikari on how he became a communist and the development of the movement in Nepal

1920 births
1999 deaths
Prime ministers of Nepal
Communist Party of Nepal (Unified Marxist–Leninist) politicians
Communist Party of Nepal (original) politicians
People from Biratnagar
People from Kathmandu
Nepalese expatriates in India
Nepalese expatriates in China
Nepal MPs 1991–1994
Nepal MPs 1994–1999
20th-century prime ministers of Nepal
Khas people